In the mathematical field of representation theory, a trivial representation is a representation  of a group G on which all elements of G act as the identity mapping of V. A trivial representation of an associative or Lie algebra is a (Lie) algebra representation for which all elements of the algebra act as the zero linear map (endomorphism) which sends every element of V to the zero vector.

For any group or Lie algebra, an irreducible trivial representation always exists over any field, and is one-dimensional, hence unique up to isomorphism. The same is true for associative algebras unless one restricts attention to unital algebras and unital representations.

Although the trivial representation is constructed in such a way as to make its properties seem tautologous, it is a fundamental object of the theory. A subrepresentation is equivalent to a trivial representation, for example, if it consists of invariant vectors; so that searching for such subrepresentations is the whole topic of invariant theory.

The trivial character is the character that takes the value of one for all group elements.

References
.

Representation theory